Mirosław Mosór (born 25 February 1968) is a retired Polish football midfielder.

References

1968 births
Living people
Polish footballers
Ruch Chorzów players
Wawel Kraków players
Association football midfielders